Wojciech Krysiak (born 10 December 1998) is a Polish male acrobatic gymnast. With partners Jakub Kosowicz, Tomasz Antonowicz and Radoslaw Trojan, Krysiak achieved 6th in the 2014 Acrobatic Gymnastics World Championships.

References

External links
 

1998 births
Living people
Polish acrobatic gymnasts
Male acrobatic gymnasts
Place of birth missing (living people)